The 1997 Supertaça Cândido de Oliveira was the 19th edition of the Supertaça Cândido de Oliveira, the annual Portuguese football season-opening match contested by the winners of the previous season's top league and cup competitions (or cup runner-up in case the league- and cup-winning club is the same). The 1997 Supertaça Cândido de Oliveira was contested over two legs, and opposed Boavista and Porto of the Primeira Liga. Porto qualified for the SuperCup by winning the 1996–97 Primeira Divisão, whilst Boavista qualified for the Supertaça by winning the 1996–97 Taça de Portugal.

The first leg which took place at the Estádio do Bessa, saw Boavista defeat Porto 2–0. The second leg which took place at the Estádio das Antas, saw the Dragões defeat the Axadrezados 1–0, but the Axadrezados win a third Supertaça after 2–1 on aggregate over two legs.

First leg

Details

Second leg

Details

References

Supertaça Cândido de Oliveira
1997–98 in Portuguese football
FC Porto matches
Boavista F.C. matches